Sidney Sam (born 31 January 1988) is a German former professional footballer who played as a forward or winger. He was known for his explosive speed and dribbling style.

Club career

Early career
Sam started playing football at TuS Mettenhof. After that, Sam played at Kilia Kiel. In the summer of 2002, he signed for the city rivals of Kilia Kiel, Holstein Kiel.

At the beginning of the 2004–05 season, Sam moved on to the Hamburger SV youth system, and in 2006, he was promoted to the second team. In the 2007–08 season, he became part of the professional pool of Hamburg.

On 20 December 2007, Sam made his debut in the Bundesliga against VfB Stuttgart when he came on as a substitute for David Jarolím. He joined 1. FC Kaiserslautern on loan for the 2008–09 season and was loaned for another season on 1 July 2009.

Bayer Leverkusen
Sam then moved to Bayer Leverkusen in 2010 signing a five-year contract. He started off the season well and on 8 November 2010, he played against his former club 1. FC Kaiserslautern. Down 1–0, he started the comeback when he smashed a driven shot into the net. Patrick Helmes then completed the comeback as he made it 2–1. The day belonged to Sam as he smashed home a first time volley almost 25 meters out, stunned the entire stadium and made a name for himself that day while the goal was crowned Goal of the Month (Germany). On 17 February 2011, he scored a double in Bayer's UEFA Europa League match against Metalist Kharkiv, with both last-minute goals coming in added time.

Schalke 04
On 8 January 2014, Sam signed a four-year contract with Schalke 04 running until 30 June 2018. He joined S04 for a transfer fee of €2,500,000 in June 2014, upon completion of the 2013–14 Bundesliga season. On 11 May 2015, he was suspended indefinitely from the club in the aftermath of a loss to 1. FC Köln.

Loan to Darmstadt 98
In January 2017, Bundesliga club SV Darmstadt 98 announced that Sam has signed a loan agreement with the club until 30 June 2017.

Short spells at the end of his professional career
On 31 August 2017, VfL Bochum signed Sam on a two-year deal. On 2 October 2019, Sam signed a contract with Austrian club SCR Altach until the end of the 2019–20 season. His last professional club was Antalyaspor in Turkey.

Retirement
Sam announced his retirement from playing at the age of 33 in September 2021. Overall he played more than 220 matches in the first and second level of the German league pyramid.
In December 2022 he started his coaching training with MSV Duisburg.

International career

Born to a German mother and Nigerian father, Sam would have been eligible to play for the Nigeria national team, but decided early on to represent his country of birth. He was a German youth national player, starring in Germany's under-19 and under-20 teams. On 29 May 2013, he made his senior international debut for Germany in a friendly game against Ecuador in Boca Raton, Florida. On 8 May 2014, Sam was named to the 30-man provisional squad for the 2014 FIFA World Cup by German national team manager, Joachim Löw. But Sam didn't make the cut and his five internationals in 2013 became his final total with "Die Mannschaft."

Style of play
Sam has been likened by observers in German football to the Dutch winger Arjen Robben of Bayern Munich, due to his explosive speed and dribbling style and possibly due to his frequent deployment on the right-wing and as an outside forward, cutting inside on his favoured left-foot to unleash his fierce shots, which leads to him scoring spectacular long-range goals. Sam is likened to a young Ryan Giggs, due to his ability to dribble with the ball at top speed. His comparison to Ryan Giggs and Arjen Robben is seen in the influence of the way he shoots and gets into goal-scoring situations coming in from both flanks on the football pitch. He utilizes his explosive speed by running-in-behind defenders and he is often as well deployed as an outside forward and striker.

Career statistics

Club

International

References

External links
 
 
 
 

1988 births
Living people
Association football forwards
Association football wingers
Sportspeople from Kiel
German footballers
Hamburger SV players
Hamburger SV II players
1. FC Kaiserslautern players
Bayer 04 Leverkusen players
FC Schalke 04 players
SV Darmstadt 98 players
VfL Bochum players
SC Rheindorf Altach players
German sportspeople of Nigerian descent
Germany youth international footballers
Germany under-21 international footballers
Germany international footballers
Bundesliga players
2. Bundesliga players
Austrian Football Bundesliga players
Süper Lig players
Footballers from Schleswig-Holstein
German expatriate footballers
German expatriate sportspeople in Austria
Expatriate footballers in Austria
German expatriate sportspeople in Turkey
Expatriate footballers in Turkey